General elections were held in Sikkim in May 1953. The Sikkim National Party and the Sikkim State Congress both won six seats. Voter turnout was less than 30%.

Electoral system
The State Council was established in 1953 by the Chogyal. It had 18 members, of which 12 were elected and six (including the President) appointed by the Chogyal. Of the 12 elected members, six were for the Nepali community and six for the Lepcha and the Bhutia communities.

Candidates for election to the Council had to be at least 30 years old, whilst the voting age was set at 21. Around 50,000 voters registered for the election.

Results

Constituency-wise

Appointed members
In addition to the elected members, five members were appointed to the Sikkim State Council by the Chogyal; John S. Lal (President of the Council and Dewan of Sikkim), Rai Bahadur Densapa, Tekbir Khati, Palda Lama and Hon Lt Prem Bahadur Basnet.

Executive Council
Following the elections, an Executive Council was appointed, which consisted of the President of the Council, John S. Lal and two of the elected members, Sonam Tsering and Kashiraj Pradhan.

References

Elections in Sikkim
Sikkim
1950s in Sikkim
Election and referendum articles with incomplete results